Castelvenere is a town and comune in the Province of Benevento, Campania Region, Italy.  It is a member of the Titerno "Local Action Group."

International relations

Twin towns – Sister cities
Castelvenere is twinned with:

 Xewkija, Malta

References

External links
 Castelvenere (Italian)

Cities and towns in Campania